Andrea Keller Quartet is an Australian jazz quartet fronted by Andrea Keller. Originally formed in 1999 as a quintet they released their first album Thirteen Sketches in 2001. It won the  ARIA Award for Best Jazz Album in 2002 (credited to Andrea Keller). They also received nominations for the same award in 2005 (Angels and Rascals), 2007 (Little Claps) and 2014 (Wave Rider).

Members
Andrea Keller - Piano
Eugene Ball - Trumpet
Ian Whitehurst - Tenor saxophone
Joe Talia - Drums

Discography
The Andrea Keller Quintet
Thirteen Sketches (2001)

Andrea Keller Quartet
Angels and Rascals (2004)
Little Claps (2007)
Galumphing 'Round the Nation (2009)
Andrea Keller Quartet Greatest Hits (2016)

Andrea Keller Quartet with Strings
Wave Rider (2014) - Jazzhead

References

External links
Andrea Keller

Victoria (Australia) musical groups